Q68 may refer to:
 Q68 (New York City bus)
 Al-Qalam, the 68th surah of the Quran
 
 Pine Mountain Lake Airport, in Tuolumne County, California, United States